Sitaphe is a genus of beetles in the family Carabidae, containing the following species:

 Sitaphe hamifera Baehr, 2003
 Sitaphe incurvicollis Baehr, 2003
 Sitaphe minuta Baehr, 2003
 Sitaphe ovipennis Baehr, 2003
 Sitaphe parallelipennis Baehr, 2003
 Sitaphe parvicollis Baehr, 2003
 Sitaphe rotundata Moore, 1963
 Sitaphe trapezicollis Baehr, 2003

References

Psydrinae